is the third studio album from Yuki Saito, released on October 21, 1986 by Canyon Records. It reached #2 on the Oricon charts. The original LP release contained ten songs, though the CD released at the same time had two additional songs: "Aozora no Kakera" and "Yubiwa Monogatari", both from the "Aozora no Kakera" single release earlier that year.

History
Chime was released on LP, cassette, and CD on October 21, 1986 by Canyon Records. The original LP and cassette releases contained ten songs each, and the CD contained two additional songs: "Aozora no Kakera" and "Yubiwa Monogatari", both from the "Aozora no Kakera" single release earlier that year. The LP and cassette album contain one song released previously as a single, and the CD contains three. All three contain an additional nine songs not previously released as singles. The album reached #2 on the Oricon charts and sold 267,000 copies.

 reached #3 on the Oricon charts, #6 on The Best Ten chart, and #19 by Oricon in overall sales for singles in 1986. It was used as the first theme song for the 1986 Fuji TV anime television series Maison Ikkoku. It was also used as an image song for the "Morning Fresh" line of shampoos and styling products from Shiseido.

 (with B-side ) reached #1 on the Oricon charts and #3 on The Best Ten chart. It was used in commercials for the Axia brand of cassette tapes from Fujifilm in Japan.

Chime has been rereleased twice since the original release in 1985. It was released as a "Gold CD" on March 21, 1989 (catalog #D35A-0478), and in a special paper jacket packaging and remastered high quality (or "HQ") CD on August 5, 2009 (catalog #PCCA-50132).

Chart history

Track listing
LP (catalog #C28A0520, released October 21, 1986)
Cassette (catalog #28P6657, released October 21, 1986)

CD (catalog #D32A-0234, released October 21, 1986)
Gold CD (catalog #D35A-0478, released March 21, 1989)
HQ CD (catalog #PCCA-50134, released March 25, 2009)

Notes

References

1986 albums
Pony Canyon albums
Yuki Saito (actress) albums
CIMP albums